Samuel Bard (May 18, 1825 – September 18, 1878) was a United States politician, newspaper editor and served briefly as Governor of Idaho Territory.

Biography
Born in New York City, Bard moved to the South in 1845.

Career
Bard served as the elected superintendent of public instruction in Louisiana 1855–1857 and was also a newspaper editor and part-owner of the Memphis Avalanche. 
Bard served in the Confederate States Army during the American Civil War in the rank of captain. 
In 1870, President Ulysses S. Grant appointed Bard Governor of Idaho Territory, and he signed the oath of office, secured a leave of absence to remain in Georgia, and then resigned the office in order to accept appointment as postmaster in Atlanta, Georgia.  He later moved to Pensacola, Florida, and then Baton Rouge, Louisiana, where he published and edited newspapers.

Death
Bard died in Baton Rouge, Louisiana as a result of yellow fever.

See also

References

External links
 
 The Papers of Andrew Johnson Volume 9, September 1865 - January 1866
Idaho Historical Society

1825 births
1878 deaths
Politicians from New York City
People of Louisiana in the American Civil War
Editors of Louisiana newspapers
Louisiana politicians
Georgia (U.S. state) politicians
Governors of Idaho Territory
Northern-born Confederates
Confederate States Army officers
Deaths from yellow fever
Louisiana State Superintendents of Education
19th-century American politicians
Infectious disease deaths in Louisiana
Educators from New York City
19th-century American educators
Georgia (U.S. state) postmasters
Editors of Florida newspapers
19th-century American newspaper editors